Pionnat is a commune in the Creuse department in the Nouvelle-Aquitaine region in central France.

Geography

History
During the French Revolution of 1848, some of the villagers were killed in an attempt to seek the release of their friends who were imprisoned for tax evasion.

Population

Sights
 The church of St. Martin, dating from the thirteenth century.
 Dolmen and menhir at the hamlet of Ménardeix.
 Two châteaux, at Ternes and at Bosgenêt.
 The viaduct over the Creuse.
 The ancient abbey des Terne.

See also
Communes of the Creuse department

References

Communes of Creuse